Dynein axonemal heavy chain 1 is a protein that in humans is encoded by the DNAH1 gene.

Function

This gene encodes an inner dynein arm heavy chain that provides structural support between the radial spokes and the outer doublet of the sperm tail. Naturally occurring mutations in this gene are associated with primary ciliary dyskinesia and multiple morphological anomalies of the flagella that result in asthenozoospermia and male infertility. Mice with a homozygous knockout of the orthologous gene are viable but have reduced sperm motility and are infertile. [provided by RefSeq, Feb 2017].

References

Further reading